Channan Pir is a village in the Punjab province of Pakistan, it is named after a Sufi saint and contains his tomb. It is located between the Derawar and Din Gargh forts and lies a few kilometres from Yazman town, and in the start of the Cholistan desert. The village is linked to Jalaluddin Surkh-Posh Bukhari who was said to have come to the village while travelling en route to Jaisalmir during the 13th century.

Festival
It is a centre of the spiritual and cultural heritage of Yazman and Cholistan. Cultural activities are observed when the Urs (a religious fair) of Channan Pir is held. Urs is held on seven consecutive Thursdays starting in the month of March every year. The visitors throw tabbaruk (the sacred sweet) and the persons who pick and taste this tabarruk are supposed to be fortunate in achieving their worldly pursuits.

References

Pakistani Sufi saints
Villages in Bahawalpur District